The women's 4 × 200 metre freestyle relay event at the 2015 European Games in Baku took place on 27 June at the Aquatic Palace.

Results

Heats
The heats were started at 10:22.

Final
The final was held at 19:26.

References

Women's 4 x 200 metre freestyle relay
2015 in women's swimming